Hines is both a surname and a given name.

Etymology

According to the Oxford Dictionary of Family Names in Britain and Ireland, the modern name Hines and its variants derive from two quite different medieval names.
 The Irish Ó hEidhin, which means 'descendant of Eidhin'. The dictionary adds that Eidhin itself is 'a personal name of uncertain origin. It may be a derivative of eidhean "ivy", or it may represent an altered form of the place-name Aidhne’ and that 'the principal family of this name is descended from Guaire of Aidhne, King of Connacht. From the 7th century for over a thousand years they were chiefs of a territory in east County Galway. There appears to have been another branch of the family located in east County Limerick'.
 The Middle English name Hine (with the addition of the genitive -s case ending, implying that the name-bearer was the child of a father called Hine, or addition of -s on the analogy of such names). This occupational name derives from Old English hīne ('household servant, farm labourer'), but in the Middle English period could also mean 'farm manager' and also be used of high-status people serving in a lordly household.

Distribution
Around 2011, there were 4206 bearers of the surname Hines in Great Britain and 61 in Ireland. In 1881, there were 2471 bearers of the name in Great Britain, spread throughout England but especially in Lancashire. In the mid-nineteenth century, Irish examples of the name were concentrated in Offaly.

People
Notable people with the name include:

Surname 
Hines (Kent cricketer), British cricketer
Adrian Hines (aka MC ADE), American musician
Andre Hines (born 1958), American football player
Andrico Hines (born 1980), American football player
Barbara Hines, American baseball player
Barbara Hines (born 1950), American artist
Barry Hines (1939–2016), British author
Bo Hines (born 1995), American football player and politician
Brendan Hines  (born 1976), American actor and singer-songwriter
Brian Hines (born 1944), the birth name of British rock musician Denny Laine
Chasen Hines (born 2000), American football player
Cheryl Hines (born 1965), American actress
David Gordon Hines (1915–2000), British accountant
Deni Hines (born 1970), Australian singer
D'Juan Hines (born 1994), American football player
Donald E. Hines (1933–2019), U.S. politician and physician
Duncan Hines (1880–1959), American food critic
Earl Hines (1903–1983), American jazz pianist
Edward N. Hines (1870–1938) American road builder and developer
Francis Hines (1920-2016), American artist
Frank T. Hines (1879–1960), American military officer
Frazer Hines (born 1944), British actor
Geoff Hines (born 1960), New Zealand rugby union player
Gerald D. Hines (1925–2020), American real estate developer
Gregory Hines (1946–2003), American actor and tap dancer
Gustavus Hines (1809–1873), American missionary
Harris Hines (1943–2018), American judge
Jerome Hines (1921–2003), American basso opera singer
Jesse K. Hines (1829–1889), American politician
Jim Hines (born 1946), American track and field athlete
John L. Hines (1868–1968), American Army general
Johnny Hines (1895–1970), American actor 
Karen Hines, Canadian actress and director
Kyle Hines (born 1986), American basketball player
Marcia Hines (born 1953), American-Australian actress and TV personality
Marie Hines, American singer-songwriter
Maurice Hines (born 1943), American actor, director, singer and choreographer
Nathan Hines (born 1976), Australian/Scottish rugby player
Nyheim Hines (born 1996), American football player
Paul Hines (1855–1935), American professional baseball player
Peter Hines (born 1948), Australian footballer
Peter F. Hines (1927–1984), American attorney and politician
Rico Hines (born 1978), American basketball coach
St. Aubyn Hines (born 1972), Jamaican boxer
Ted Hines (1926–1983), American librarian
Thomas Hines (1838–1898), Confederate spy during the American Civil War
Tiffany Hines (born 1985), American actress 
Timothy Hines, American film director
Tyler Hines (born 1990), American basketball player
Walker Hines (1870–1934), American railway executive
Zavon Hines (born 1988), British footballer

Given name 
Hines Holt (1805–1865), American lawyer and politician
Hines Johnson (1910–1987), Jamaican cricketer
Hines Ward (born 1976), American football player

See also
Heinz (surname)
Heinz (given name)
Hine (disambiguation)
Hynes
Heine, a surname
Heines, a surname
Hinds (surname)

References

Surnames
English-language surnames
Surnames of English origin
Surnames of Scottish origin
Surnames from given names